Walter Stanley Monroe (May 14, 1871 – October 6, 1952) was a businessman and conservative politician who served as Prime Minister of Newfoundland from 1924 to 1928 as leader of the Liberal-Conservative Progressive Party.

He was born in Ireland in 1871, the first son of John Monroe, a distinguished lawyer who became Solicitor-General for Ireland, and his wife Elizabeth Moule. He was educated at the Harrow School, England.  He emigrated to Newfoundland to join his uncle, Moses Monroe,  at the age of 17 in 1888.

Monroe was a successful businessman who briefly served in the government of William Warren. He emerged from the political crisis that destroyed the governments of Sir Richard Squires and William Warren as leader of a new party, the Liberal-Conservative Progressive Party, which had been cobbled together by Warren and the opposition Conservatives after Warren's government fell. The party was essentially a conservative party and swept to power in the 1924 election, weeks after it was formed.

The Monroe government saw a successful settlement of the Labrador boundary dispute with Canada after Newfoundland successfully argued its case at the Judicial Committee of the Privy Council in London. As Prime Minister, one of his first moves in power was to abolish the personal income tax, and to reduce corporate taxes paid by banks.  His government introduced a franchise bill to the legislature in 1925, where it passed unanimously on March 9, and became law on April 13, 1925.  Now, women were allowed to vote in elections for the first time.   Monroe returned to private life and resigned on August 15, 1928 passing the leadership of the party to his cousin Frederick C. Alderdice who became the new Prime Minister.  In 1929, Mr. Monroe was made a member of the Legislative Council of Newfoundland.

References

External links
Newfoundland in the 1920s

1871 births
1952 deaths
Politicians from Dublin (city)
Prime Ministers of the Dominion of Newfoundland
Irish emigrants to pre-Confederation Newfoundland
Canadian people of Ulster-Scottish descent